Lenka Vlasáková (born 27 April 1972, in Prague) is a Czech actress. She played the title role in Lea, released in 1997; Lucie in Kawasaki's Rose, released in 2010; and U mě dobrý (Fine with me), released in 2008.

Selected filmography
 Lea (1997)
 We Are Never Alone (2016)

References

External links

1972 births
Living people
Czech television actresses
Czech film actresses
Actresses from Prague
21st-century Czech actresses
20th-century Czech actresses
Czech Lion Awards winners
Czech stage actresses